Edwardsomyia is a genus of crane fly in the family Limoniidae.

Distribution
Chile.

Species
E. chiloensis Alexander, 1929

References

Limoniidae
Nematocera genera
Diptera of South America
Endemic fauna of Chile